The Četvrta NL Čakovec-Varaždin (Croatian) also known as the NL ČK-VŽ is a fourth tier league competition in the Croatian football league system. The league was formed in 2014 as the "Međužupanijska liga Čakovec-Varaždin" and in 2017, it changed its name to "Četvrta NL Čakovec-Varaždin". The league covers clubs from Međimurje County and Varaždin County.

2022-2023 Teams

List of winners

See also
 Croatian football league system

References

 
5
2014 establishments in Croatia
Croa